is a town located in Saitama Prefecture, Japan. , the town had an estimated population of 9,497 in 3994 households and a population density of 150 persons per km2.

Geography
Located in western Saitama Prefecture, Minano is on the upper reaches of the Arakawa River.

Surrounding municipalities
 Saitama Prefecture
 Chichibu
 Honjō
 Kamikawa
 Yorii
 Nagatoro
 Higashichichibu

Climate
Minano has a humid continental climate (Köppen Cfa) characterized by warm summers and cool winters with light  snowfall.  The average annual temperature in Minano is 12.8 °C. The average annual rainfall is 2222 mm with September as the wettest month. The temperatures are highest on average in August, at around 24.1 °C, and lowest in January, at around 1.6 °C.

Demographics
Per Japanese census data, the population of Minano has declined steadily over the past 70 years.

History
The village of Minano was created within Chichibu District, Saitama with the establishment of the modern municipalities system on April 1, 1889. It was elevated to town status on November 10, 1928. On September 8, 1943 Minano was merged with the neighboring villages of Kunikami, Kanazawa, Hinozawa, Misawa and Ota to form the new town of Mino. However, the town was dissolved on December 1, 1946 back into its original components. 
On March 1, 1955, Minano again annexed the neighboring villages of Kunikami, Kanazawa, and Hinozawa followed by the village of Misawa on March 31, 1957.

Government
Minano has a mayor-council form of government with a directly elected mayor and a unicameral town council of 12 members. Minano, together with the towns of Higashichichibu, Ogano, Nagatoro and Yokoze, contributes one member to the Saitama Prefectural Assembly. In terms of national politics, the town is part of Saitama 11th district of the lower house of the Diet of Japan.

Economy
The economy of Minano is based primarily on precision machining and agro-tourism.

Education
Minano  has three public elementary schools and one public middle school operated by the town government, and one public high school operated by the Saitama Prefectural Board of Education..

Transportation

Railway
 Chichibu Railway - Chichibu Main Line
 –

Highway

Local attractions
Nagatoro Gorge
Chichibu 34 Kannon Sanctuary

References

External links

Official Website 

Towns in Saitama Prefecture
Chichibu District, Saitama
Minano, Saitama